Lake Highlands station is a DART Light Rail station in Dallas, Texas. It is located near the intersection of Skillman Street and Walnut Hill Lane in the Lake Highlands area, adjacent to the Lake Highlands Town Center development. DART announced plans for the station in 2006. It opened on December 6, 2010 as part of the Blue Line expansion and the second infill station in DART's system.

External links
 DART - Lake Highlands station

References 

Dallas Area Rapid Transit light rail stations in Dallas
Railway stations in the United States opened in 2010
Railway stations in Dallas County, Texas